China Smith is a 30-minute American syndicated television adventure series starring Dan Duryea. It is set in Singapore. It was released in the fall of 1952. The program's alternate title was The Affairs of China Smith, and the last 26 episodes were syndicated with the title The New Adventures of China Smith.

Premise 
The title character was a soldier of fortune,  "an opportunistic con artist and sometimes private eye" who sought adventure . Episodes had Smith confronting  characters who ranged from Communists to "bigger crooks than he was." He often helped people who were innocent but somehow were entangled with villains. The other regular characters were a madam who helped Smith and a chief of police who sometimes helped and sometimes interfered.

The series's pilot was shown as an episode of Schlitz Playhouse of Stars.

Cast
 Dan Duryea as China Smith
 Douglass Dumbrille as Inspector Hobson
 Myrna Dell as Shira
 Clarence Lung as Johnny Fung
Much of the cast and crew also worked on the film World for Ransom, which is considered an extension of the television program.

Production 
Bernard Tabakin was the producer. Arthur Person was the director, with Robert Aldrich directing two episodes. Robert C. Dennis was the writer.

The series was made with a two-year gap; the first 26 episodes being filmed in Mexico in 1952, the second 26 episodes were shot in 1954-1955 in San Francisco and Los Angeles. The change occurred after the American Federation of Television and Radio Artists (AFTRA) complained that the productions in Mexico deprived AFTRA members of work. Divisions of the International Alliance of Theatrical Stage Employees (IATSE) and the American Federation of Labor (AFL) also protested the Mexican filming. Roy Brewer, who was chair of the AFL's Hollywood Film Council and representative of the West Coast IATSE, complained to Thrifty Drug Stores, which sponsored the show on KECA-TV, resulting in the company's withdrawal of the six Mexican-filmed episodes from the station. Tabakin was removed from the council's "'unfair' list" after he agreed to limit production of TV shows to the United States.

Production of the show was stopped in April 1954 by the Screen Actors Guild's (SAG) cancellation of the contract that it had with producer Tableau Television, Limited (TT). SAG charged that TT had not met the contract's requirements for royalty payments to actors.

China Smith was financed and distributed by Proktor Syndication International (PSI-TV).

Episode list

References

External links

China Smith at CVTA

1952 American television series debuts
1955 American television series endings
American adventure television series
Black-and-white American television shows
English-language television shows
First-run syndicated television programs in the United States
Television series by CBS Studios
Television shows set in Singapore
Television shows filmed in Mexico
Television shows filmed in Los Angeles